The National Film Award for Best Film on Other Social Issues is one of the category in the National Film Awards presented annually by the Directorate of Film Festivals, the organization set up by the Ministry of Information and Broadcasting in India. It is one of several awards presented for feature films and is awarded with Rajat Kamal (Silver Lotus).

The National Film Awards were established in 1954 to "encourage production of the films of a high aesthetic and technical standard and educational and culture value" and also planned to included awards for regional films. In 1984, at the 32nd National Film Awards various new categories were instituted for Swarna Kamal and Rajat Kamal. Categories like the Best Supporting Actor, Best Supporting Actress, Best Costume Design along with the Best Film on Other Social Issues were introduced for the Rajat Kamal. This category was introduced to be awarded annually for films produced in the year across the country, in all Indian languages.  since its inception, the award has been present thirty-three times to thirty-six films. It has been presented for films in seven languages with the highest being twelve in Hindi, followed by ten in Malayalam, five in Tamil, four in Marathi, three in Bengali, two in Kannada and one in Telugu. It was not presented on two occasion in 1985 (33rd ceremony) and 2011 (59th ceremony).

The inaugural award was conferred upon production banner Sanket (Rajat Kamal and  30,000) and director Shankar Nag (Rajat Kamal and  15,000) for their Kannada film Accident for dealing with the bold topic of whistleblowing against political corruption and dealing with bad effects of alcoholism. On five occasion the award was shared by two films: in 1987 by Tamil films Ore Oru Gramathiley and Vedham Pudhithu, in 1993 by Janani (Bengali) and  Naaraayam (Malayalam), in 1994 by Wheelchair (Bengali) and  Parinayam (Malayalam), in 2000 by Munnudi (Kannada) and Vetri Kodi Kattu (Tamil), and in 2003 by Hindi films Koi... Mil Gaya and Gangaajal.

Winners 
The award includes 'Rajat Kamal' (Silver Lotus) and cash prize to the producers and director each. The first award in 1984 had a monetary association of  30,000 to the producers and  15,000 to the directors. In 1995 at the 43rd award ceremony the Marathi film Doghi was honoured and the cash prices were revised to 30,000 each presented to the director duo Sumitra Bhave–Sunil Sukthankar and co-producers National Film Development Corporation of India (NFDC) and Doordarshan. The monetary association was again revised to   1,50,000 to both the producers and directors in 2006 at the 54th ceremony where producer Policherla Venkata Subbiah and director Satish Kasetty's Telugu film Hope was the winner.

Following are the award winners over the years:

References

External links 
 Official Page for Directorate of Film Festivals, India
 National Film Awards Archives
 National Film Awards at IMDb

Other Social Issues